Shortsharpshock is the first extended play (EP) released by Northern Irish rock band Therapy?. It was released on 8 March 1993 through A&M Records, reaching number nine on the UK Singles Chart and number 22 on the Irish Singles Chart. Its lead track is "Screamager", which peaked at number 16 on the US Billboard Modern Rock Tracks chart. In September 2000, "Screamager" ranked at number 86 in Kerrang! magazine's "100 Greatest Riffs Ever" feature.

The first three tracks on the EP appear on the Hats Off to the Insane mini-album released in North America and Japan. "Screamager" features on the 1994 album Troublegum. "Accelerator" is a re-recording, different from the version on Nurse. The EP was released on 7-inch vinyl, limited edition pink 7-inch vinyl, 12-inch vinyl, CD digipak, and cassette (packaged in a flip-top box styled like a cigarette pack).

Track listing

Personnel
 Andy Cairns – vocals, guitar
 Fyfe Ewing – vocals, drums
 Michael McKeegan – bass
 Chris Sheldon – producer

Charts

References

1993 debut EPs
A&M Records albums
Albums produced by Chris Sheldon
Therapy? albums